Simcoe Centre was an electoral riding in Ontario, Canada. It was created in 1886 from parts of Simcoe South and Simcoe North It was abolished in 1996 before the 1999 election and merged into the riding of Barrie—Simcoe—Bradford.

Members of Provincial Parliament

References

Former provincial electoral districts of Ontario